German submarine U-731 was a Type VIIC U-boat of Nazi Germany's Kriegsmarine during World War II. The submarine was laid down on 1 October 1941 at the Schichau-Werke yard at Danzig, launched on 25 July 1942, and commissioned on 3 October 1942 under the command of Oberleutnant zur See Werner Techand.

Attached to 8th U-boat Flotilla based at Kiel, U-731 completed her training period on 30 April 1943 and was assigned to front-line service.

Design
German Type VIIC submarines were preceded by the shorter Type VIIB submarines. U-731 had a displacement of  when at the surface and  while submerged. She had two shafts and two  propellers.

U-731 was fitted with five  torpedo tubes (four fitted at the bow and one at the stern), fourteen torpedoes, one  SK C/35 naval gun, 220 rounds, and two twin  C/30 anti-aircraft guns. The boat had a complement of between forty-four and sixty.

Service history

On the fourth and final war patrol, U-731 was detected on 15 May 1944 by two Catalinas, P-14 and P-1, of VP-63 off Tangiers, when the U-boat tried to force the Strait of Gibraltar. U-731 was sunk in position ; all 54 crew members perished in the attack.

References

Bibliography

External links

German Type VIIC submarines
1942 ships
Ships built in Danzig
U-boats commissioned in 1942
U-boats sunk in 1944
U-boats sunk by depth charges
U-boats sunk by British warships
Maritime incidents in May 1944
World War II shipwrecks in the Atlantic Ocean
World War II submarines of Germany
Ships lost with all hands
Ships built by Schichau